Robby McCrorie (born 18 March 1998) is a Scottish professional footballer who plays as a goalkeeper for Rangers.

McCrorie previously had loan spells with Berwick Rangers, Greenock Morton, Queen of the South and Livingston.

Club career
From the village of Dailly in South Ayrshire, McCrorie was scouted by Rangers, the team his family supported, at a young age and started training with the Govan club at the age of fourteen.

On 17 June 2017, after being involved in match-day squads over the previous two seasons without making an appearance, McCrorie was loaned out to Berwick Rangers. In December 2017, McCrorie signed a contract extension with the Light Blues until May 2022. Despite the Wee Gers finishing third last in the league, McCrorie played a major role that season, winning the club's player of the year award.

On 25 January 2019, McCrorie was loaned to Greenock Morton, alongside fellow Rangers youth player Andy Dallas until the end of the 2018–19 season.

On 4 July 2019, McCrorie went on loan to Queen of the South on a deal that was due to run for the whole of the 2019–20 season  but he was recalled by Rangers during January 2020. McCrorie was then loaned out to Scottish Premiership club Livingston until 31 May 2020, making eight appearances for the club.

After signing a new contract at Rangers until 2023, McCrorie returned to Livingston on loan for the 2020–21 season on 9 July 2020.

After a first team debut in the UEFA Europa League against FC Alashkert, McCrorie made his first league start for Rangers against Old Firm rivals Celtic on 29 August 2021. McCrorie kept a clean sheet and made vital saves to help Rangers to a 1–0 victory.

International career
McCrorie has represented Scotland at various youth levels. 

He played for Scotland U16 in the Victory Shield in 2012–13 and 2013–14. With his brother Ross, Scotland won it in 2013–14. McCrorie was selected for the Scotland U17 team in the UEFA under-17 Championship in 2014, where the Netherlands beat in the semi finals, and 2015, this time with his brother in the squad. 

Chosen for the under-21 squad in the 2018 Toulon Tournament, the team lost to Turkey in a penalty-out and finished fourth. He was added to the senior squad for the first time in September 2020. In September 2022 he was booked for delaying the play during a 2022–23 UEFA Nations League match against Ukraine, while among the Scotland substitutes and still awaiting his debut for the national team.

Personal life
Robby is the twin brother of Aberdeen player Ross McCrorie.

Career statistics

Honours
Livingston
Scottish League Cup: Runner-up 2020–21

Rangers
UEFA Europa League Runner-up: 2021–22

References

External links

1998 births
Living people
Footballers from South Ayrshire
Scottish footballers
Scotland youth international footballers
Scotland under-21 international footballers
Association football goalkeepers
Rangers F.C. players
Berwick Rangers F.C. players
Greenock Morton F.C. players
Queen of the South F.C. players
Livingston F.C. players
Scottish Professional Football League players
Scottish twins
Twin sportspeople